Essen West station is situated in Essen on the Witten/Dortmund–Oberhausen/Duisburg railway in the German state of North Rhine-Westphalia. It is served by lines S1, S3 and S9 of the Rhine-Ruhr S-Bahn.

History 

The section of the Witten/Dortmund–Oberhausen/Duisburg railway between Essen and Mülheim an der Ruhr was opened by the Bergisch-Märkische Railway Company on 1 March 1862.

The location of the station was selected as a result of its proximity to coal mines and in particular to the Krupp cast steel works. In the 1880s, it was opened as Altendorf station. Later it was renamed Altendorf-Cronenberg, in 1898 it was renamed Altendorf Essen-Süd. In 1901, with the incorporation of Altendorf and Frohnhausen into the city of Essen, the station was renamed Essen West.

Originally a former residence of the workers colony of Kronenberg on the north side of the former railway line and east of the present station served as the station building.

In 1912 and 1913, the current station building was built south of the line and a few hundred metres west of the old station. At times, it contained a station restaurant. After severe war damage to the entire station precinct in the Second World War, the not yet repaired Essen West station was mocking called Wasserbahnhof (“water station”). The station building was repaired with changes. The completely rebuilt station restaurant opened in March 1949.

Essen West Station has been served by two S-Bahn lines S1 and S3 since 1974 and also by line S9 since 1998.

Current situation 

The station is exclusively served by the Rhine-Ruhr S-Bahn. It lies on the Witten/Dortmund–Oberhausen/Duisburg railway and the Mülheim-Heißen–Oberhausen-Osterfeld Nord railway. It is classified by Deutsche Bahn as a category 4 station. An underpass leads from the station building, which was built in 1913, under the four tracks. The platforms were renovated in 2012 and 2013. A kiosk has replaced the former restaurant.

Transport services 

The station is served by two Regional-Express services: the RE 14 (Der Borkener) and the RE 49 (Wupper-Lippe-Express). It is served by lines S 1, S 2 and S 9 of the Rhine-Ruhr S-Bahn.

Notes

S1 (Rhine-Ruhr S-Bahn)
S3 (Rhine-Ruhr S-Bahn)
S9 (Rhine-Ruhr S-Bahn)
Rhine-Ruhr S-Bahn stations
West